The 2011 Faisalabad bombing occurred on 8 March 2011. At least 25 people were killed and over 127 wounded when a car bombing occurred in a compressed natural gas station in Faisalabad, Punjab, Pakistan. Tehrik-i-Taliban Pakistan claimed responsibility for the explosion.

Background 
Faisalabad is the third-largest city in Pakistan and an important industrial hub of Punjab province; the attack was the first of its kind in the area, which usually remained safe from terrorist incidents. Many textile companies are based in Faisalabad. Pro-Taliban militant groups had been gaining strength in the area, which had previously witnessed sectarian violence.

Attack 
The car bomb exploded at a compressed natural gas station at about 10:30 am, leaving a 7-foot deep by 15-foot wide crater. According to local officials a Toyota Corolla packed with 40 kilograms of explosives was used in the attack.

The vicinity in which the attack took place was a sensitive area, surrounded by Inter-Services Intelligence (ISI) and military offices. A Pakistan International Airlines building and an ISI building were damaged in the bombing. The bomb caused several gas cylinders to explode and damaged several vehicles and buildings.

The gas station was reduced to a pile of bricks and twisted metal. Rescue officials used heavy machinery and cranes to remove rubble from the scene to search for survivors. Among the dead were an ISI officer and a schoolteacher.

Responsibility 
A spokesman for Tehrik-i-Taliban Pakistan stated that the bombing, which targeted an ISI building, was in retaliation for the killing of Omar Kundi, a Taliban commander, by special forces in Faisalabad in 2010.

See also 

List of armed conflicts and attacks, 2011
List of terrorist incidents in Pakistan since 2001
War in North-West Pakistan
Terrorism in Pakistan

References 

2011 in Punjab, Pakistan
2011 murders in Pakistan
2010s crimes in Punjab, Pakistan
2011 bombing
21st-century mass murder in Pakistan
Attacks on buildings and structures in 2011
Attacks on buildings and structures in Punjab, Pakistan
Building bombings in Pakistan
Car and truck bombings in Pakistan
2011 bombing
Improvised explosive device bombings in 2011
Islamic terrorist incidents in 2011
March 2011 crimes
March 2011 events in Pakistan
Mass murder in 2011
Mass murder in Punjab, Pakistan
Tehrik-i-Taliban Pakistan attacks
Terrorist incidents in Pakistan in 2011
Terrorist incidents in Punjab, Pakistan